Safveti Ziya is an Ottoman-Turkish writer. Born in Istanbul, Safveti Ziya attended the Galatasaray High School. He held various government posts, and in the early years of the republic, he became chief of protocol in the Ministry of Foreign Affairs.

In 1896 he joined the French-influenced Servet-i Fünun literary movement. Safveti Ziya is best known for his novel Salon Köşelerinde (1910), a portrait of the cosmopolitan social life of Istanbul.

His works:
Bir Tesadüf (1900)
Bir Safha-i Kalp (1900)
Salon Köşelerinde (roman, 1912)
Haralambos Cankiyadis (oyun, 1912)
Hanım Mektupları (1913)
Kadın Ruhu (öykü, 1914)
Silinnmiş Çehreler-Bilinen Simalar (öykü 1924)
Adab-ı Muaşeret Hasbihalleri (1927)
Nasıl Giyinmeli? (1929)
Yarım Kalmış Yıldız Böcekler (1908-1909)
Dahilî Teşrifat Rehberi (1928)

19th-century writers from the Ottoman Empire
Year of birth missing
Year of death missing